Gundiali is a village and former non-salute princely state on Saurashtra peninsula in Gujarat, western India.

History 
The minor princely state, in Jhalawar prant, was ruled by Jhala Rajput Chieftains.
In 1901 it comprised two villages, with a population of 1,465, yielding 17,655 Rupees state revenue (1903-4, mostly from land), paying 1,408 Rupees tribute to the British.

See also 
 Gundiyali, village in Kutch, Gujarat

References

Sources and external links 
 Imperial Gazetteer, on DSAL.UChicago.edu - Kathiawar

Princely states of Gujarat
Rajput princely states